Platyptilia ainonis is a moth of the family Pterophoridae. It is known from Japan (Hokkaido, Honshu), Kyrgyzstan and Tajikistan.

Description 
The length of the forewings is 10–12 mm.

The larvae probably feed on Anaphalis margaritacea.

References

ainonis
Moths of Japan
Moths described in 1931
Taxa named by Shōnen Matsumura